As a given name, surname, or nickname, Brick may refer to:

People with the given name 
 Brick Haley (born 1966), American football coach and player
 Brick Smith (born 1959), American baseball player

People with the nickname 
 Brick Breeden (1904–1977), American college basketball coach and player
 Brick Bronsky (born 1964), American actor, film producer, and professional wrestler
 Brick Eldred (1892–1976), American baseball player
 Charles Harris Garrigues (1903–1974), American writer and journalist
 Brick Fleagle (1906–1992), American jazz guitarist
 Norman MacArthur (born 1950), shinty player and manager
 Harold Muller (1901–1962), American National Football League player-coach and track and field athlete
 Brick Owens (1885–1949), American baseball umpire

People with the surname 
 Abraham L. Brick (1860–1908), American politician
 Andy Brick, American composer and conductor
 Billy Brick, Irish hurler
 Hamudi Brick (born 1978), Arab-Israeli former footballer
 Ian Brick, Irish hurler
 Julia E. B. Brick (1819–1902), American philanthropist
 Marilyn Brick, Canadian politician
 Max Brick (born 1992), English diver
 Richard Brick (1945–2014), American film producer
 Samantha Brick, English writer and journalist
 Scott Brick (born 1966), American actor, writer and narrator
 Shane Brick, Irish hurler
 Thomas Brick (1867–1938), Canadian politician

See also 
 
 
 Brick (disambiguation)

Lists of people by nickname